Group B of the 2003 Fed Cup Americas Zone Group II was one of two pools in the Americas Zone Group II of the 2003 Fed Cup. Five teams competed in a round robin competition, with the top team advancing to Group I in 2004.

Bolivia vs. Trinidad and Tobago

Jamaica vs. Bermuda

Bolivia vs. Jamaica

Chile vs. Bermuda

Bolivia vs. Bermuda

Chile vs. Trinidad and Tobago

Bolivia vs. Chile

Jamaica vs. Trinidad and Tobago

Jamaica vs. Chile

Trinidad and Tobago vs. Bermuda

  placed first in the pool, and thus advanced to Group I in 2003, where they were faced relegation down to Group II for 2004.

See also
Fed Cup structure

References

External links
 Fed Cup website

2003 Fed Cup Americas Zone